Germany's Next Topmodel, cycle 13 aired on ProSieben from February 2018.

The prizes included a modeling contract worth €140,000 with ONEeins fab Management, a spread and cover in the German Harper's Bazaar, a €100,000 cash prize and an Opel Adam. Thomas Hayo and Michael Michalsky returned for their spots as judges, the teams and battle concept remained.

The international destinations this cycle are Las Terrenas, Los Angeles, San Diego, New York, Cancún, Lisbon, Paris and Havana.

The winner of this season was 18-year-old Toni Dreher-Adenuga  from Stuttgart.

Contestants
(ages stated are at start of contest)

Episode summaries

Episode 1: Auftakt in der Karibik 
Original airdate: 

The 13th season of Germany's Next Top Model started with a big casting. Out of 100 applicants, only 50 girls have made it. They flew to the Caribbean. There, they had their first photoshoot and their first walk in front of Heidi. 29 girls made it to the next round.

Featured photographer: Shayan Asgharnia

Episode 2: Das Nackt-Shooting 
Original airdate: 

The new week started with a catwalk training. After that, the girls had to walk against each other in a challenge. Each one girl of their team. The challenge has won by Team Michael. The photoshoot this week was a nude photoshoot on the beach. The girls were shocked and unhappy about that. After the shoot, Selma was eliminated.

At elimination, Ivana decided to quit the competition. After that, Lania and Viktoria W. were eliminated for their weak performance in the photoshoot.

Challenge winner: Team Michael
Shoot out: Ivana Rajić-Hrnjić & Selma Toroy
Eliminated outside of judging panel: Selma Toroy
Best performance: Klaudia Giez & Pia Riegel
Quit: Ivana Rajić-Hrnjić
Eliminated: Lania Barzanji & Viktoria Wendell
Featured photographer: Rankin
Special guests: Nikeata Thompson & Papis Loveday

Episode 3: Sprung in den Winter 
Original airdate: 

The week started with a photoshoot. The girls had to jump on a trampoline and were wearing fur. After the photoshoot, Liane was eliminated. The girls had their first casting for the Christian Cowan fashion show. All girls except Anne, Christina, Julia and Klaudia were booked.

At elimination, Anne, Christina, Isabella, Julia, Klaudia, Victoria and Zoe found them self at the bottom. In the end, Julia was eliminated for her bad performance at the shoot and for not booking the job.

Shoot out: Gerda Lewis & Liane Polt
Eliminated outside of judging panel: Liane Polt
Booked for job: Abigail Odoom, Bruna Rodrigues, Franziska Schwager, Gerda Lewis, Isabella Özedemir, Jennifer Michalczyk, Julianna Townsend, Karoline Seul, Lis Kanzler, Pia Riegel, Sally Haas, Sara Leutenegger, Sarah Amiri, Shari Streich, Stephanie Groll, Toni Dreher-Adenuga, Trixi Giese, Valerie Wersche, Victoria Pavlas & Zoe Saip
Best performance: Pia Riegel
Bottom seven: Anne Volkmann, Christina Peno, Isabella Özedemir,  Julia Freimuth, Klaudia Giez, Victoria Pavlas & Zoe Saip
Eliminated: Julia Freimuth
Featured photographer: Max Montgomery
Special guests: Christian Cowan & Tim Labenda

Episode 4: Das große Umstyling! 
Original airdate: 

The girls arrived in Los Angeles. There, they got their new makeovers. On the next day, the girls had a sedcard photoshoot.

At elimination, Lis and Valerie were eliminated.

Eliminated: Lis Kanzler & Valerie Wersche
Featured photographer: Brian Bowen Smith
Special guests: Kerstin Weng

Episode 5: Das Einhorn-Rodeo 
Original airdate: 

The week started with a Unicorn Rodeo photoshoot. After the shoot, Karoline was eliminated. On the next day, Abigail, Bruna and Sally flew to Cancun, Mexico for a casting for the German InStyle. Sally was booked for the job. The other 17 girls had a challenge, where they had to change into a party outfit in a lift and against each other. The challenge was won by Team Thomas.

At elimination, Bruna, Franziska, Gerda, Isabella, Jennifer, Pia, Sara, Shari, Victoria and Zoe landed in the bottom ten. In the end, Franziska and Isabella were eliminated.

Shoot out: Karoline Seul & Trixi Giese
Eliminated outside of judging panel: Karoline Seul
Challenge winner: Team Thomas
Booked for job: Sally Haas 
Best performance: Klaudia Giez
Bottom ten: Bruna Rodrigeus, Franziska Schwager, Gerda Lewis, Isabella Özedemir, Jennifer Michalczyk, Pia Riegel, Sara Leutenegger, Shari Streich, Victoria Pavlas & Zoe Saip
Eliminated: Franziska Schwager & Isabella Özedemir
Featured photographer: Shane Russack
Special guests: Caro Daur, Kerstin Weng, Nikeata Thompson & Papis Loveday

Episode 6: GNTM Hip-Hop Edition 
Original airdate: 

The week started with a Hip Hop video shoot with Brooke Candy. Most of the girls did not do so well, but Pia and Shari were praised. After that, Klaudia, Toni and Zoe were invited to a casting for Nylon magazine to Portugal. Zoe was booked for the job. The other girls had a challenge. They had to dance against each other. The challenge was won by Team Thomas.

At elimination, Sarah was eliminated.

Challenge winner: Team Thomas
Booked for job: Zoe Saip
Best performance: Pia Riegel & Shari Streich
Eliminated: Sarah Amiri
Special guests: Brooke Candy, Cro, Dennis Jauch & Jarren Barboza.

Episode 7: Boys, Boys, Boys 
Original airdate: 

The week started with a photoshoot. The girls had to pose with a nude male model. After the shoot, Gerda was eliminated. Anne, Bruna, Christina, Julianna, Pia, Sally, Sara, Toni, Victoria & Zoe were invited to a casting for Deichmann. Bruna, Julianna, Pia, Sally and Toni were booked for the job. The other 6 girls had a workout with James Wilson.

At elimination, Abigail, Anne, Shari, Victoria & Zoe landed in the bottom five. In the end, Anne was eliminated.

Shoot out: Gerda Lewis & Jennifer Michalczyk
Eliminated outside of judging panel: Gerda Lewis
Booked for job: Bruna Rodrigues, Julianna Townsend, Pia Riegel, Sally Haas & Toni Dreher-Adenuga
Best performance: Julianna Townsend
Bottom five: Abigail Odoom, Anne Volkmann, Shari Streich, Victoria Pavlas & Zoe Saip
Eliminated: Anne Volkmann
Featured photographer: Yu Tsai
Special guests: Andreas Conze & James Wilson

Episode 8: Magic Bride 
Original airdate: 

Bruna, Christina, Sara and Trixi were invited for a casting for Elle magazine in Paris, France. Christina was booked for the job. The girls had a video shoot. They had to portray a bride in a pub, where each girl also had a different emotion to portray.

At elimination, the girls had a challenge. The theme was a beauty pageant. They had to walk against each other, had to make a speech and say why they are better than the other one. Klaudia won the challenge and got immunity, but she also had the choice to save an eliminated girl. Stephanie and Trixi were eliminated, but Klaudia decided to save Trixi, while Stephanie had to leave.

Booked for job: Christina Peno
Challenge winner/Immune: Klaudia Giez
Originally eliminated: Trixi Giese
Eliminated: Stephanie Groll
Featured director: Lance Drake
Special guests: Magic Mike Live crew

Episode 9: Action Edition 
Original airdate: 

The week started with a photo shoot. The girls had to portray Hollywood divas in extreme heights. After the shoot, Shari was eliminated. The girls had a casting for About You. Julianna and Toni were booked and flew to Havana, Cuba. But they also got immunity for the next elimination.

At elimination, Abigail, Bruna and Victoria landed in the bottom three. In the end, Abigail was eliminated for her bad performance at the photoshoot.

Shoot out: Jennifer Michalczyk & Shari Streich
Eliminated outside of judging panel: Shari Streich
Booked for job/Immune: Julianna Townsend & Toni Dreher-Adenuga
Best performance: Christina Peno
Bottom three: Abigail Odoom, Bruna Rodrigues & Victoria Pavlas
Eliminated: Abigail Odoom
Featured photographer: Markus Schäfer
Special guests: Julian Jansen & Sofia Tsakiridou

Episode 10: Surprise, Surprise 
Original airdate: 

The week started with a fashion
gymnastics photoshoot. Christina, Julianna, Pia and Toni were invited for a casting in Lissabon, Portugal. Pia and Toni were booked for the job. The other 8 girls moved in their new home.

At elimination, the girls had a Mickey Mouse runway show. After that, Bruna and Victoria were eliminated, because of their weak performance at the photoshoot.

Booked for job: Pia Riegel & Toni Dreher-Adenuga
Best performance: Klaudia Giez
Eliminated: Bruna Rodrigues & Victoria Pavlas
Featured photographer: Oliver Beckmann
Special guests: Wincent Weiss

Episode 11: Social Media Edition 
Original airdate: 

The week started with a photoshoot. The girls were driving through Los Angeles and were taking a shower. After that, the girls had a casting for Gilette Venus. Christina was booked for the job. Then the girls had an interview with Julia Bauer. At the end of the teaching, it was revealed that Klaudia, Pia and Trixi were the best.
 
At elimination, Zoe was eliminated.

Booked for job: Christina Peno
Eliminated: Zoe Saip
Featured photographer: Christian Anwander
Special guests: Julia Bauer

Episode 12: Family & Friends 
Original airdate: 

The week started with a photo challenge. But what the girls did not know was that they got visits from their family and friends except Trixi. Toni and Klaudia went with Heidi to the amfAR Gala. This week the girls had a 60s housewives video shoot. The girls also had to sell a product.

At elimination, Sally, Sara and Trixi landed in the bottom three. In the end, Trixi was eliminated.

Best performance: Toni Dreher-Adenuga
Bottom three: Sally Haas, Sara Leutenegger & Trixi Giese
Eliminated: Trixi Giese
Featured director: Justin Wu

Episode 13: Water Edition 
Original airdate: 

This week started with a teaching. The girls learn how to pose underwater. Christina, Jennifer and Julianna were invited for a casting for Maybelline. Julianna was booked for the job. At the next day, the girls had an Underwater mermaid photoshoot. After that, the girls had a challenge. The girls were divided into groups. They had to portray twins with their styling. Sally and Toni won the challenge.

At elimination, Nobody was eliminated. Later, Heidi announced, that all girls, except Julianna, are next week in the Shoot out and two girls will be going home.

Challenge winner: Toni Dreher-Adenuga & Sally Haas
Booked for job/Immune: Julianna Townsend
Eliminated: None
Featured photographer: Chris Straley
Special guests: Virginia Henkins & Wolfgang Joop

Episode 14: Drag Edition 
Original airdate: 

The week started with a casting for MCM Worldwide. Christina and Toni were booked for the job. After that, the girl a Gender swap photoshoot with Alessandra Ambrosio. After the shoot, Klaudia and Sara were eliminated.

At elimination, the remaining 6 girls had a runway show with the drag queens Laganja Estranja, Moni Stat, Jaidynn Diore Fierce, Farrah Moan, Misty Violet and Morgan McMichaels. After that, Sally was eliminated because of her weak performance at the photoshoot and runway.

Shoot out: Christina Peno, Jennifer Michalczyk, Klaudia Giez, Pia Riegel, Sally Haas, Sara Leutenegger & Toni Dreher-Adenuga
Eliminated outside of judging panel: Klaudia Giez & Sara Leutenegger 
Booked for job: Christina Peno & Toni Dreher-Adenuga
Best performance: Toni Dreher-Adenuga
Bottom two: Jennifer Michalczyk & Sally Haas
Eliminated: Sally Haas
Featured photographer: Kristian Schuller
Special guests: Alessandra Ambrosio

Episode 15: Das Halbfinale 
Original airdate: 

The week started with the Harper's Bazaar cover shot. On the next day, the girls had a last runway training.

At elimination, the girls had their last runway show and were wearing Jean Paul Gaultier couture dresses. Heidi announced that Toni is the 1st finalist. After that, Pia became the 2nd finalist. Then, Christina became the 3rd finalist. Jennifer and Julianna landed in the bottom two and Jennifer was eliminated making Julianna the 4th finalist.
 
Bottom two: Jennifer Michalczyk & Julianna Townsend
Eliminated: Jennifer Michalczyk
Featured photographer: Regan Cameron
Special guests: Kerstin Schneider, Nikeata Thompson & Papis Loveday

Episode 16: Das große Finale 
Original airdate: 

The final started with a drag queen fashion show. Then followed the first decision. Christina and Julianna landed in the bottom two and Christina was the first eliminated. Then they had to prove again on the runway. After that, Pia was the second eliminated. The last task was a photoshoot with german singer Wincent Weiss. After the final runway, Toni was declared the winner of Germany's Next Topmodel.
 
Final four: Christina Peno, Julianna Townsend, Pia Riegel & Toni Dreher-Adenuga
Bottom two: Christina Peno & Julianna Townsend
Eliminated: Christina Peno
Final three: Julianna Townsend, Pia Riegel & Toni Dreher-Adenuga
Bottom two: Julianna Townsend & Pia Riegel
Eliminated: Pia Riegel
Personality Award: Klaudia Giez
Final two: Julianna Townsend & Toni Dreher-Adenuga
Germany's Next Topmodel: Toni Dreher-Adenuga
Featured photographer: Rankin
Special guests: Cro, Rebecca Mir, Rita Ora, Shawn Mendes & Wincent Weiss

Summaries

 
 The contestant was eliminated outside of judging panel
 The contestant withdrew from the competition
 The contestant was immune from elimination 
 The contestant was originally eliminated from the competition but was saved
 The contestant won best photo 
 The contestant was in danger of elimination
 The contestant was eliminated
 The contestant won the competition

Photo shoot guide
Episode 1 photo shoot: 60 second test shoot (Casting)
Episode 2 photo shoot: Nude on the beach
Episode 3 photo shoot: Wearing fur whilst jumping on a trampoline
Episode 4 photo shoot: Sedcards
Episode 5 photo shoot: Fairies on a Unicorn Rodeo
Episode 6 video shoot: Hip Hop music video
Episode 7 photo shoot: Posing with a nude male model
Episode 8 video shoot: Playing as a bride in a pub
Episode 9 photo shoot: Posing as Hollywood divas on the roof
Episode 10 photo shoot: Fashion gymnastics in mid-air
Episode 11 photo shoot: Taking a shower in Los Angeles 
Episode 12 video shoot: Portraying 60's wives whilst selling a product
Episode 13 photo shoot: Underwater mermaids
Episode 14 photo shoot: Gender Swap with Alessandra Ambrosio
Episode 15 photo shoot: Harper's Bazaar covers
Episode 16 photo shoot: Posing with singer Wincent Weiss

References

External links 
Official Website

2018 German television seasons
Germany's Next Topmodel
Television shows filmed in the Dominican Republic
Television shows filmed in California
Television shows filmed in New York City
Television shows filmed in Mexico
Television shows filmed in Portugal
Television shows filmed in France
Television shows filmed in Cuba